Heavy Meta (stylized as HEAVY META) is the second solo studio album by Ron Gallo, released on February 3, 2017.

Reception 

Heavy Meta score of 72 out of 100 on the online review aggregate site Metacritic, indicating "Generally favorable reviews"."

Track listing

Charting 
 "Young Lady, You're Scaring Me": No. 30 Adult Alternative Songs, No. 46 Mediabase Alternative

Personnel 
 Produced by: Joe Bisirri & Ron Gallo 
 Mixed by: Joe Bisirri 
 Recorded by: Joe Bisirri 
 Mastered by: Ryan Schwabe 
 A&R: Kim Buie

References 

2017 albums
Ron Gallo albums
New West Records albums